This is a list of encyclopedias and encyclopedic/biographical dictionaries published on the subject of geography and geographers in any language. Entries are in the English language except where noted.

General geography
Baker, Daniel B. Explorers and discoverers of the world. Gale Research, 1993. .
Countries of the World. Bureau Development, 1991.
Crump, Donald J. Exploring Your World: The Adventure of Geography. National Geographic Society, 1990.
Cuff, David J. and William J. Young. The United States Energy Atlas. 2nd ed., Macmillan, 1986.
Douglas, Ian, Richard J. Huggett, C. R. Perkins. Companion encyclopedia of geography: From local to global. Routledge, 2007. .
Dow, Maynard Weston. Geographers on film: Visual record and archival resource. Geographers on Film, 1970–. Available online here.
Dunbar, Gary S. Modern Geography: An Encyclopedic Survey. Garland, 1991.
Dunbar, Gary S. A biographical dictionary of American geography in the twentieth century. Geoscience Publications, Dept. of Geography and Anthropology, Louisiana State University, 1996. .
Encyclopedic Dictionary of Physical Geography. Basil Blackwell, 1985.
Freeman, Thomas Walter, Marguerita Oughton, Philippe Pinchemel, International Geographical Union. Geographers: Biobibliographical studies. Mansell. ISSN 0308-6992.
Geo-Data: The World Geographical Encyclopedia. 2nd ed., Gale Research, 1989.
Geopedia. Encyclopædia Britannica Corp., 1994. 

Gregory, Derek. The dictionary of human geography. Blackwell, 2009. .

Handbook of the Nations, 9th ed., Gale Research, 1989.

Harte, John. Toxics A to Z: A Guide to Everyday Pollution Hazards. University of California Press, 1991.
Howgego, Raymond John. Encyclopedia of exploration, 1800 to 1850: A comprehensive reference guide to the history and literature of exploration, travel and colonization between the years 1800 and 1850. Hordern House, 2004. .
Howgego, Raymond John. Encyclopedia of exploration, 1850 to 1940: The oceans, islands and polar regions; A comprehensive reference guide to the history and literature of exploration, travel and colonization in the oceans, the islands, New Zealand and the polar regions from 1850 to the early decades of the twentieth century. Hordern House, 2006. .
Howgego, Raymond John. Encyclopedia of exploration to 1800: A comprehensive reference guide to the history and literature of exploration, travel, and colonization from the earliest times to the year 1800. Hordern House, 2003. .
Huber, Thomas P. Dictionary of Concepts in Physical Geography. Greenwood, 1988. 
Huxley, Anthony. Standard Encyclopedia of the World's Monuments. Putnam, 1962. 
The Illustrated Encyclopedia of World Geography. Oxford University Press, 1990–1993.
Jafari, Jafar. Encyclopedia of tourism. Routledge, 2000. .
Jones, Emrys. Marshall Cavendish Illustrated Encyclopedia: World and Its People. Rev. Ed., Marshall Cavendish, 1988.
Kane, Joseph. Facts About the States. H. W. Wilson, 1989.
 
Lands and Peoples. Rev. ed., Grolier, 1993.
Larkin, Robert P., Gary L. Peters. Biographical dictionary of geography. Greenwood Press, 1993. .
Mccoll, R.W. (2005), Encyclopedia of World Geography, Infobase Publishing, free ebook from ebook3000.com, 1,216 pages. .   

National Foreign Assessment Center (U.S.), United States. The world factbook. Central Intelligence Agency, 1981–. ISSN 0277-1527. .
Rand McNally Encyclopedia of World Rivers (1980), Rand McNally

Sachs, Moshe Y. Worldmark Encyclopedia of the Nations. 7th ed., Wiley, 1988.
Shapiro, William E. The Young People's Encyclopedia of the United States. Millbrook, 1992.
Shekhar, Shashi, Hui Xiong. Encyclopedia of GIS. Springer, c2008. .
Smith, Ben A., James W. Vining. American geographers, 1784–1812: A bio-bibliographical guide. Praeger, 2003. .
Statesman's Year Book: Statistical and Historical Annual of the States of the World. St. Martin's Press, 1864–.

van der Leeden, Frits. The Water Encyclopedia: A Compendium of Useful Information on Water Resources. 2nd ed., Lewis Publishers, 1990.
Waldman, Carl, Alan Wexler, Jon Cunningham. Encyclopedia of exploration. Facts On File, 2004. .
Warf, Barney. Encyclopedia of geography. Sage Publications, 2010. .

The World Book Encyclopedia of People and Places. World Book, 1992.
World Fact File. Facts on File, 1990.
World Factbook. Quanta Press, 1989.

Africa
Cambridge Encyclopedia of Africa. Cambridge University Press, 1981.

North Africa
Cambridge Encyclopedia of the Middle East and North Africa. Cambridge University Press, 1988.

Americas

Caribbean
Collier, Simon. The Cambridge Encyclopedia of Latin America and the Caribbean. 2nd ed., Cambridge University Press, 1992.

Latin America
Collier, Simon. The Cambridge Encyclopedia of Latin America and the Caribbean. 2nd ed., Cambridge University Press, 1992.
Nuñez, Benjamin. Dictionary of Afro-Latin American Civilization. Greenwood, 1980.

North America
Bartlett, Richard A. Rolling Rivers: An Encyclopedia of America's Rivers. McGraw-Hill, 1984.
Bender, Gordon L. Reference Handbook on the Deserts of North America. Greenwood, 1982.

Canada
Encyclopedia Canadiana. Grolier, 1975.
Marsh, James H. The Canadian Encyclopedia. 2nd ed., Hurtig Publishers, 1988. 
Marsh, James H. The Junior Encyclopedia of Canada. Hurtig Publishers, 1990.

United States
Kane, Joseph Nathan, Charles Curry Allen. The American counties: Origins of county names, dates of creation, and population data, 1950–2000. Scarecrow Press, 2005. .

Central West
Encyclopedia of the Central West. Facts on File, 1989.

Far West
Encyclopedia of the Far West. Facts on File, 1989.

Midwest
Encyclopedia of the Midwest. Facts on File, 1989.

New England
O'Brien, Robert and Richard D. Brown. The Encyclopedia of New England. Facts on File, 1985.

Southern United States
Encyclopedia of the South. Facts on File, 1989.

Antarctica
Stewart, John. Antarctica: An Encyclopedia. McFarland, 1990.

Asia

Central Asia
Brown, Archie. The Cambridge Encyclopedia of Russia and the Former Soviet Union. 2nd ed., Cambridge University Press, 1993.
The Great Soviet Encyclopedia. 3rd ed., Macmillan, 1973–83.

East Asia

China
Cambridge Encyclopedia of China. 2nd ed., Cambridge University Press, 1991.
Lin, Chun, Hans Hendrischke. The territories of the People's Republic of China. Routledge, 2006. .

Japan
Cambridge Encyclopedia of Japan. Cambridge University Press, 1993.
Japan: An Illustrated Encyclopedia. Kodansha America, 1993. 
Kodansha Encyclopedia of Japan. Kodansha, 1983.
Perkins, Dorothy. Encyclopedia of Japan: Japanese History and Culture from Abacus to Zori. Facts on File, 1991.

Russia
Brown, Archie. The Cambridge Encyclopedia of Russia and the Former Soviet Union. 2nd ed., Cambridge University Press, 1993.
The Great Soviet Encyclopedia. 3rd ed., Macmillan, 1973–83.
Wilson, Andrew and Nina Bachkatov. Russia and the Commonwealth A to Z. HarperPerennial, 1992.

South Asia

Bangladesh
Cambridge Encyclopedia of India, Pakistan, Bangladesh, Sri Lanka, Nepal, Bhutan, and the Maldives. Cambridge University Press, 1989.

Bhutan
Cambridge Encyclopedia of India, Pakistan, Bangladesh, Sri Lanka, Nepal, Bhutan, and the Maldives. Cambridge University Press, 1989.

India
Cambridge Encyclopedia of India, Pakistan, Bangladesh, Sri Lanka, Nepal, Bhutan, and the Maldives. Cambridge University Press, 1989.
Chand, S. India: An Encyclopedic Survey. 1983.
Chopra, P. N. Encyclopedia of India. Rima Publishing House, 1992–.

Maldives
Cambridge Encyclopedia of India, Pakistan, Bangladesh, Sri Lanka, Nepal, Bhutan, and the Maldives. Cambridge University Press, 1989.

Pakistan
Cambridge Encyclopedia of India, Pakistan, Bangladesh, Sri Lanka, Nepal, Bhutan, and the Maldives. Cambridge University Press, 1989.

Sri Lanka
Cambridge Encyclopedia of India, Pakistan, Bangladesh, Sri Lanka, Nepal, Bhutan, and the Maldives. Cambridge University Press, 1989.

Western Asia
Cambridge Encyclopedia of the Middle East and North Africa. Cambridge University Press, 1988.

Iran
Yarshater, Ehsan. Encyclopedia Iranica. Routledge & Kegan Paul, 1982–.

Europe

Eastern Europe
Brown, Archie. The Cambridge Encyclopedia of Russia and the Former Soviet Union. 2nd ed., Cambridge University Press, 1993.
The Great Soviet Encyclopedia. 3rd ed., Macmillan, 1973–83.

Ukraine
Kubijovyc, Volodymyr. Encyclopedia of Ukraine. University of Toronto Press, 1984–93. 
Ukraine: A Concise Encyclopedia. University of Toronto Press, 1963–70.

Western Europe

Iceland
Icelandic Encyclopedia A-Ö

Ireland
de Breffny, Brian. Ireland: A Cultural Encyclopedia. Facts on File, 1983.
Lewis, Samuel. A topographical dictionary of Ireland: Comprising the several counties, cities, boroughs, corporate, market, and post towns, parishes, and villages, with historical and statistical descriptions . . . Genealogical Publishing Co., 1984. .

United Kingdom
Friar, Stephen. The local history companion. Sutton Publishing, 2001. .

England
Ekwall, Eilert. The concise Oxford dictionary of English place-names. Clarendon Press, 1960.
Lewis, Samuel. A topographical dictionary of England. Institute for Historical Research, 1848. Available online here.
Mills, A. D. A dictionary of British place-names. Oxford University Press, 2003. .
Watts, V. E., John Insley, Margaret Gelling. The Cambridge dictionary of English place-names: Based on the collections of the English Place-Name Society. Cambridge University Press, 2004. .

Scotland
Lewis, Samuel. A topographical dictionary of Scotland: comprising the several counties, islands, cities, burgh and market towns, parishes, and principal villages with historical and statistical descriptions. Genealogical Publ. Co., 1989. .
Wilson, John M. The gazetteer of Scotland. Willow Bend Books, 2002.

Oceania

Australia
Australian Encyclopedia. 5th ed., Australian Geographic Society, 1988. 
Cambridge Encyclopedia of Australia. Cambridge University Press, 1993.
Shaw, John. The Concise Encyclopedia of Australia. 2nd ed., David Bateman Ltd., 1989.

New Zealand
McLauchlan, Gordon. The Illustrated Encyclopedia of New Zealand. David Bateman Ltd., 1990.

Cities
Cities of the World. Gale Research, 1982.
Kurian, George Thomas. World Encyclopedia of Cities. ABC-Clio, 1993–.

Oceanography
Couper, Alastair. The Times Atlas and Encyclopedia of the Sea. HarperCollins, 1989. 
Groves, Donald. Ocean World Encyclopedia. McGraw-Hill, 1980.
Standard Encyclopedia of the World's Oceans and Islands. Putnam, 1962.

Rivers and lakes
Bartlett, Richard A. Rolling Rivers: An Encyclopedia of America's Rivers. McGraw-Hill, 1984.
Rand McNally Encyclopedia of World Rivers. Rand McNally, 1980. 
Standard Encyclopedia of the World's Rivers and Lakes. Putnam, 1966.

See also 
 Bibliography of encyclopedias

Citations

References 
Guide to Reference.  American Library Association. Retrieved 5 December 2014. (subscription required).
Kister, Kenneth F. (1994). Kister's Best Encyclopedias (2nd ed.). Phoenix: Oryx. .

Geography
Geography books